Iwkowa  is a village in Brzesko County, Lesser Poland Voivodeship, in southern Poland. It is the seat of the gmina (administrative district) called Gmina Iwkowa.

The village has a population of 2,699. Every year the village hosts a festin outside the church.

The integral areas of the village are: Góry, Kąciny, Kozieniec, Nadole, Nagórze, Pagórek, Piekarzowo, Sołtysie, Zagrod.

History
The settlement in the territory of the present village Iwkowa dates back to the Neolithic period, i.e., the Stone Age (c. 4000-1700 years BCE ), when the first agricultural population appeared leading a sedentary life.

References

Iwkowa